Cedric Kulbach (born 15 June 1993) is a German lightweight rower. He won a gold medal at the 2016 World Rowing Championships in Rotterdam with the lightweight men's quadruple scull.

References

1993 births
Living people
German male rowers
World Rowing Championships medalists for Germany